Hurd Curtis Willett (January 1, 1903 – March 26, 1992) was an American meteorologist known for his role in developing five-day weather forecasting techniques and widely known for his attempts at very long-range forecasting. 

Born in Providence, Rhode Island, Willett grew up on a farm near Pittsburgh, Pennsylvania. He graduated with a B.S. degree from Princeton University in 1924, then worked at the U.S. Weather Bureau, and earned a doctorate in meteorology from George Washington University (GWU) in 1929. Willett won a Guggenheim Fellowship to study then burgeoning polar front theory, what became known as the Bergen School of Meteorology, in Norway. He joined the Massachusetts Institute of Technology (MIT) faculty in 1929, where he headed the development and adoption of the polar front theory of five-day weather prediction by the Weather Bureau. In 1951 he received a plaque from the American Meteorological Society (AMS) for Extraordinary Scientific Achievement. This was the initial prize award of what is now known as the Carl-Gustaf Rossby Research Medal.

Willett was a member of the American Academy of Arts and Sciences (AASC), the American Meteorological Society, the Royal Meteorological Society (RMetS),  the Association of American Geographers (AAG), the American Geophysical Union (AGU), the American Association for the Advancement of Science (AAAS), Sigma Xi, and Phi Beta Kappa.

Willett married Dorothy Bachman Lloyd and had three daughters and two sons. He died in West Concord, Massachusetts, after suffering a stroke.

References 

 Professor H.C. Willett Dies
 Princeton alumni memorial

External links 

 The New York Times obituary
 Paper published by Hurd C Willet in the Journal of the Atmospheric Sciences May 1968.
 

American meteorologists
Princeton University alumni
George Washington University alumni
Massachusetts Institute of Technology faculty
1903 births
1992 deaths
Carl-Gustaf Rossby Research Medal recipients